The 2019 FireKeepers Casino 400 was a Monster Energy NASCAR Cup Series race scheduled for June 9, 2019 at Michigan International Speedway in Brooklyn, Michigan. Contested over 203 laps—extended from 200 laps due to an overtime finish, on the  D-shaped oval, it was the 15th race of the 2019 Monster Energy NASCAR Cup Series season. The race was postponed to Monday, June 10, due to rain. Joey Logano won his second race of the season in his championship defense.

Report

Background

The race was held at Michigan International Speedway, a  moderate-banked D-shaped speedway located in Brooklyn, Michigan. The track is used primarily for NASCAR events. It is sometimes known as a "sister track" to Texas World Speedway, and was used as the basis of Auto Club Speedway. The track is owned by International Speedway Corporation. Michigan International Speedway is recognized as one of Motorsports premier facilities because of its wide racing surface and high banking (by open-wheel standards; the 18-degree banking is modest by stock car standards).

Entry list

 (i) denotes driver who are ineligible for series driver points.
 (R) denotes rookie driver.

Practice

First practice

Final practice

Qualifying

Qualifying results

Race

Stage results

Stage One
Laps: 60

Stage Two

Laps: 60

Final stage results

Stage Three
Laps: 80

Race statistics
 Lead changes: 20 among 11 different drivers
 Cautions/Laps: 7 for 35
 Red flags: 0
 Time of race: 2 hours, 59 minutes and 50 seconds
 Average speed:

Media

Television
Fox NASCAR televised the race in the United States on FS1 for the fourth time at Michigan. Mike Joy was the lap-by-lap announcer, while three-time Michigan winner, Jeff Gordon and two-time winner Darrell Waltrip were the color commentators. Jamie Little, Regan Smith and Matt Yocum reported from pit lane during the race.

Radio 
Radio coverage of the race was broadcast by Motor Racing Network (MRN) and simulcasted on Sirius XM NASCAR Radio. Alex Hayden, Jeff Striegle and five-time Michigan winner Rusty Wallace announced the race in the booth while the field is racing on the front stretch. Dave Moody called the race from a billboard outside of turn 2 when the field was racing through turns 1 and 2. Mike Bagley called the race from a platform outside of turn 3 when the field was racing through turns 3 and 4. Kim Coon, Steve Post, Pete Pistone and Dillon Welch reported from pit lane during the race.

Standings after the race

Drivers' Championship standings

Manufacturers' Championship standings

Note: Only the first 16 positions are included for the driver standings.
. – Driver has clinched a position in the Monster Energy NASCAR Cup Series playoffs.

References

FireKeepers Casino 400
FireKeepers Casino 400

FireKeepers Casino 400

NASCAR races at Michigan International Speedway